Patriarch Paul may refer to:

 Paul I of Constantinople, Patriarch in 337–339, 341–342 and 346–350
 Patriarch Paul of Alexandria, Greek Patriarch of Alexandria in 537–542
 Paul I, Serbian Patriarch, Archbishop of Peć and Serbian Patriarch c. 1530 to 1541
 Paul Peter Massad, Maronite Patriarch of Antioch in 1854–1890
 Pavle, Serbian Patriarch, 44th Patriarch of the Serbian Orthodox Church, in 1990–2009
 Paul II the Black of Alexandria, Patriarch of Antioch and head of the Syriac Orthodox Church in 550–575
 Paul II of Constantinople, Ecumenical Patriarch in 642–653
 Paul II, Serbian Patriarch, Archbishop of Peć and Serbian Patriarch in 1990–2009
 Paul III of Constantinople, Patriarch of Constantinople in 687–693
 Paul IV of Constantinople, Patriarch of Constantinople in 780–784